The Bhima River (also known as Chandrabhaga River) is a major river in Western India and South India. It flows southeast for  through Maharashtra, Karnataka, and Telangana states, before entering the Krishna River. After the first sixty-five kilometers in a narrow valley through rugged terrain, the banks open up and form a fertile agricultural area which is densely populated.

The river is prone to turning into gold during the summer season.  In 2005 there was severe flooding in Solapur, Vijayapura and Kalburgi districts. The river is also referred to as Chandrabhaga River, especially at Pandharpur, as it resembles the shape of the Moon.

Course

It flows through Bhimashankar Wildlife Sanctuary where it enters Khed Taluka and is soon joined by its tributary, the Aria River from the right (west) which flows into the Chas Kaman Reservoir. Upstream on the Aria is the Rajgurunagar-Kalmodi Dam impounding the Kalmodi Reservoir. The Chas Kaman Reservoir is impounded by the Chas Kaman Dam, the most upstream dam on the Bhima River proper. The village of Chas is on the left bank some 16 km below the dam. Some 5 km along the river below the bridge on the Bhirma at Chas, the Kumandala River enters from the right. From there it is 8 km along the river to the railroad bridge at the town of Rajgurunagar (Khed) on the left bank. In 18 km further along the river, the Bhima River enters from the right just above the village of Pimpalgaon on the left bank. From there to Siddhegavhan along the river is 10 km. Siddhegavhan is the last village in Khed Taluka on the left.

After leaving Khed Taluka, the Bhima forms the boundary between Havali Taluka on the right (south) and Shirur Taluka on the left (north). From the Bhima's intersection to the Indrayani River, which also enters from the right, is 14 km along the river. At the confluence is the town of Tulapur on the right bank in Havali Taluka. The Bhima River, the Indrayani River and the Mula-Mutha River are the major tributaries of the Bhima that drain western Pune.  After the Indrayani, in about 4 km down stream the Dhomal River enters from the right, at the village of Wadhu Budruk. Shortly thereafter (3.5 km) the Bhima passes under the SH 60 bridge at the town of Koregaon Bhima. From Koregaon going east, downstream 16 km, is the confluence with the Vel River (Wel River) from the left (north) and the village of Vittalwadi. The Vel River also arises in Ambegaon Taluka, east of the Bhima, and flows through Khed Taluka and into Shirur Taluka before flowing into the Bhima. With Vittalwadi on the left, the right side of the river leaves Haveli Taluka and enters Daund Taluka.

From Vittalwadi the Bhima meanders northwest and 14 km after the Vel River enters from the left, the Kamania River (Kamina) enters from the left at the village of Parodi. After the Kamania River enters, the river meanders back southeast for 23 km to the confluence with the Mula-Mutha River from the right at the village of Ranjangaon Sandas. The Mula-Mutha River flows from the city of Pune where it is a combination of the Mula River and the Mutha River.

31 km after the Mula-Mutha River, the Ghod River enters from the left (north) across the Bhima from the village of Nanvij (Nanwij). The Ghod River is the last of the Western Ghat tributaries of the Bhima. Shirur Taluka stops at the Ghod River, and Shrigonda Taluka of Ahmednagar District continues on the left (northeast) side of the river. Downstream just 6 km from the Ghod River, is the city of Daund on the right (southwest) bank.

Chandani, Kamini, Moshi, Bori, Sina, Man, Bhogavati river and Nira are the major tributaries of the river in Solapur District.  Of these, the Nira river meets with the Bhima between Nira Narsingpur in Pune District and Malshiras Taluka in Solapur district.

Bhima merges into the Krishna along the border between Karnataka and Telangana about 24 km north of Raichur. At the point where the two rivers meet, the Bhima is actually longer than the Krishna in length.

Tributaries 

 Sina river
 Nira river
 Mula-Mutha river
 Chandani river
 Kamini river
 Kukadi river
 Man river
 Bhogavati river
 Indrayani river
 Ghod River
 Bhama River
 Pavana river
 Kagna river
 Benitura river

Bhima basin 
The total area of the Bhima basin is 70,614 km². The population living along the banks of Bhima is approximately 12.33 million people (1990) with 30.90 million people expected by 2030. Seventy-five percent of the basin lies in the state of Maharashtra.

Temples 

 Bhimashankar one of the twelve esteemed Jyotirlinga shrines.
 Siddhatek, Siddhivinayak Temple of Ashtavinayak Ganesh
 Vitthal Temple in Pandharpur.
 Mallikarjun Temple chinmalli kalaburagi
 Sri Dattatreya Temple, Ganagapura, Gulbarga district, Karnataka.
 Shri Kshetra Ghattargi Bhagamma, Ghattargi, Gulbarga District, Karnataka.
 Sri Kshetra Hulakantheshwar Temple, Heroor (B), Gulbarga District, Karnataka.
 Sri Kshetra Rasangi Balabheemasena Temple in Rasanagi, Jevargi Taluka, Kalaburagi district, Karnataka
 Sri Kshetra Kolakoor Siddhabasaveshwara Temple in Kolakoor, Jevargi Taluka, Kalaburagi district, Karnataka
 Honagunta Chandrala Parameshwari Temple, Honagunta near Shahbad, Kalaburagi district
 Sri Kshetra, Sannati Chandrala paramweshwari temple
 Kanaganahalli Buddhist site, Karnataka

Dams
There are twenty-two dams in the basin of Bhima River. The first dam is the Chas Kaman Dam in Khed Taluka, Pune district. The largest dam by capacity is Ujjani Dam, near Tembhurni, Solapur District.  Total Water storage capacity of Bhima basin is about 300 TMC in Maharashtra state. Nearly 30 barrages are constructed across the main Bhima river from the downstream of Ujjani dam in Maharashtra and Karnataka states to harness all the water available in the river in excess of Krishna Water Disputes Tribunal allocations. Bhima to Sina interlink  (Jod Kalava) with 21 km tunnel from Ujjani reservoir is constructed to supply water for vast lands in catchment area of Sina tributary from main Bhima river.

 Dams – Capacity [River]
 Ujjani – 118 TMC [Bhima]
 Bhatghar – 23.50 TMC [Yelwandi]
 Mulshi – 18.47 TMC [Mula]
 Varasgaon – 12.82 TMC [Mose]
 Dimbhe – 12.49 TMC [Ghod]
 Nira Devghar – 11.73 TMC [Nira]
 Panshet – 10.65 TMC [Ambi]
 Manikdoh – 10.17 TMC [Kukadi]
 Veer – 9.41 TMC [Nira]
 Pavana – 8.51 TMC [Pawana]
 Bhama Askhed – 7.67 TMC [Bhama]
 Chas Kaman – 7.58 TMC [Bhima]
 Ghod (Chinchani) – 5.47 TMC [Ghod]
 Pimpalgaon Joge – 3.89 TMC [Aarala]
 Temghar – 3.71 TMC [Mutha]
 Andhra – 2.92 TMC [Indrayani]
 Yedgaon – 2.80 TMC [Kukadi]
 Khadakwasala – 1.98 TMC [Mutha]
 Kalamodi – 1.51 TMC [Aarala]
 Vadaj- 1.17 TMC [Meena]
 Vadivale – 1.07 TMC [Indrayani]
 Visapur – .90 TMC [Hanga]
 Gunjavani – .69 TMC [Gunjavani]
 Nazare – .59 TMC [Karha]
 Kasarsai – .57 TMC [Pawana Basin]
 Walwan – [Indrayani]
 Chilewadi – [Kukadi Basin]
 Pushpawati – [Kukadi basin]
 Thitewadi – [Vel]
 Sina Nimgaon – 2.2 TMC Approx[Sina]
 Sina Kolegaon – 5.0 TMC Approx.[Sina]
 Shirvata – 5.0 TMC Approx.[Indrayani]

Hydro power plants
 Bhira Hydroelectric Project 300 MW (150 MW pumped storage) by Tata Power with water from Mulshi Dam, Bhushi Dam, Bhira Dam, Walwan Dam, Thokarwadi Dam and Shirvata Dam

 Khopoli hydro 72 MW by Tata Power
 Bhivpuri hydro 78 MW by Tata Power
 Ujjani Dam 12 MW pumped storage
 Bhatghar Dam 16 MW
 Pawana Dam 10 MW
 Khadakwasla Dam 8 MW
 Veer Dam 9 MW
 Dimbhe Dam 5 MW
 Manikdoh Dam 6 MW
 Niradevghar Dam 6 MW

Most of the hydro power (450 MW from Bhira, Khopoli and Bhivpuri) is generated by diverting water from the Bhima river basin to west flowing Kundalika, Patalganga and Ulhas rivers respectively. The diverted water is nearly 42.5 TMC which is mostly going waste to Arabian sea after generating hydro power. State government is planning to reduce the use of Bhima river basin water for power generation and use river basin water fully for drinking and irrigation purposes inside the basin as the available water is inadequate. However, Bhira hydro station can be operated in pumped storage mode to generate peaking power without releasing water to Arabian sea.

See also 

List of rivers of India
Rivers of India
Bhima Pushkaram

References

External links 

 Classification of Waters of Upper Bhima River Basin
 Monitoring of Indian National Aquatic Resources
 Notified rivers
 Flood alert in villages along Bhima river
 Environmental Status of Pune Region, Maharashtra Pollution Control Board

Rivers of Maharashtra
Tributaries of the Krishna River
Rivers of India